Tatham is an English surname, and a place name. It may refer to:

People
 Tatham family, the first residents of Hipping Hall
Agnes Clara Tatham (1893–1972), English artist
Alisha Tatham (born 1986), Canadian basketball player
Arthur Tatham (1808–1874), English rector, member of the Shoreham Ancients (son of Charles Heathcote Tatham, brother of Frederick Tatham)
Charles Tatham (disambiguation), several people
David Tatham (born 1939), British ambassador, governor of the Falkland Islands, and biographer
Edward Tatham (1749–1834), English academician, clergyman and controversialist
Emma Tatham (1829–1855), British poet
Frederick Tatham (1805–1878), British artist, member of the Shoreham Ancients (son of Charles Heathcote Tatham, brother of Arthur Tatham)
John Tatham (fl. 1632–1664), English dramatist
Julie Campbell Tatham (1908–1999), US writer, mostly of children's novels
Nick Tatham (born 1983), British singer-songwriter
Ralph Tatham (bap. 1778–1857), English academic and churchman
Reidun Tatham (born 1978), Canadian Olympic synchronised swimmer
Simon Tatham (born 1977), English software programmer
Tamara Tatham (born 1985), Canadian basketball player
Willie Tatham (fl. late 19th century), English footballer (goalkeeper)

Places
 Tatham, Lancashire, a civil parish in Lancashire, England
 Tatham, New South Wales, a locality in Richmond Valley, Australia

See also
 Captain Tatham of Tatham Island, a 1909 adventure novel by the British writer Edgar Wallace